Huang Ting-ying (born 29 May 1990) is a track and road cyclist from Taiwan. She competed on the track in the sprint event at the 2009 UCI Track Cycling World Championships. In 2015, she won the road race at the Asian Cycling Championships.

Major results

Track

2008
 Asian Track Championships
2nd  Team sprint
3rd  500m time trial
3rd  Sprint
2009
 2nd  Team sprint, Asian Track Championships
2010
 2nd  Team sprint, Asian Track Championships
2014
 Taiwan Hsin-Chu Track International Classic
1st Omnium
1st Sprint
1st 500m time trial
2nd Keirin
 Asian Games
3rd  Team pursuit (with Hsiao Mei-yu, Tseng Hsiao-chia & Ju I Fang)
3rd  Team sprint (with Hsiao Mei-yu)
2015
 Asian Track Championships
1st  Individual pursuit
1st  Points race
1st  Scratch
 3rd Omnium, Japan Track Cup
2016
 Asian Track Championships
1st  Individual pursuit
1st  Points race
2nd  Scratch
 Taiwan Hsin-Chu Track International
1st Scratch
2nd Keirin
2nd Team pursuit (with Chang Yao, Cheng Chia Hui & Cheng Yu Siou)
2018
 Asian Track Championships
1st  Scratch
2nd  Individual pursuit
3rd  Omnium
 Asian Games
2nd  Omnium
3rd  Individual pursuit
2019
 Asian Track Championships
1st  Scratch
2nd  Omnium
2nd  Points race

Road

2013
 2nd Overall Tour of Thailand
1st Stage 1
 8th Overall Tour of Zhoushan Island
2014
 6th Road race, Asian Road Championships
2015
 1st  Road race, Asian Road Championships
 4th Overall The Princess Maha Chackri Sirindhon's Cup
 8th Overall Tour of Chongming Island
2016
 2nd Overall Tour of Thailand
 2nd Overall Tour of Chongming Island
1st Stages 1 & 3
 5th Road race, Asian Road Championships
2017
 5th Time trial, Asian Road Championships
2018
 Asian Road Championships
2nd  Road race
2nd  Time trial
 7th Time trial, Asian Games
2019
 National Road Championships
1st  Time trial
1st  Road race
 3rd  Time trial, Asian Road Championships

References

External links

1990 births
Taiwanese female cyclists
Living people
Place of birth missing (living people)
Asian Games medalists in cycling
Cyclists at the 2010 Asian Games
Cyclists at the 2014 Asian Games
Cyclists at the 2018 Asian Games
Cyclists at the 2016 Summer Olympics
Olympic cyclists of Taiwan
Medalists at the 2014 Asian Games
Medalists at the 2018 Asian Games
Asian Games silver medalists for Chinese Taipei
Asian Games bronze medalists for Chinese Taipei